Puliyanam is a place situated near Angamaly, Ernakulam district Aluva Taluk in the state of Kerala, India. It was once a forest with large number of "Puli" trees (Tamarind trees- Tamarindus indica)Called puli forest and hence was called 'pulivanam' which later evolved as 'Puliyanam'. It is 5 kilometres west from Angamaly and 11 km north from Cochin International Airport. The nearest railway station is Angamaly. 

Puliyanam is famous for its cultural activities and educational achievements. GHSS Puliyanam, St Fransis LPS, Desasevini vayanasala, Kalamandalam Hyderali memorial kathakali club, United Arts & Sports Club, Millenium Arts and sports club, Ethernet Web Solutions, Navadhara club and Sneha Cultural Center are all situated in puliyanam. Main agricultural products here include rice, banana, Tapioca, coconut, Bean, trees and rubber.

Puliyanam is also famous for its stone quarries. Puliyanam stone is used for making high quality idols for temples and various other complex granite shapes. The famous drama artist"Puliyanam Poulose" is from here.

External links
.

Cities and towns in Ernakulam district